PFC Levski Sofia, otherwise simply known as Levski or Levski Sofia, is a professional football club based in Sofia, Bulgaria.

This is a list of the club's achievements in major competitions in Bulgarian and European football. It covers all seasons from 1921 (when the first official competitive football tournament was held in Bulgaria), to the most recent completed season.

Levski Sofia has taken part in all national football championships since they are officially organized and has never been relegated from the top division of the Bulgarian football championship.

The club has won 26 league titles, 11 Sofia championship titles, 26 Bulgarian cups and 3 Bulgarian supercups.

Key

 P = Played
 W = Games won
 D = Games drawn
 L = Games lost
 F = Goals for
 A = Goals against
 Pts = Points
 Pos = Final position

 SC = Sofia Championship
 SFC = State Football Championship
 NFD = National Football Division
 RFC = Republic Football Championship
 A Group = A Football Group
 Prem = Premier football league
 FPL = First Professional Football league
 TC = Tsar's Cup
 CSA = Cup of the Soviet Army
 BC = Bulgarian Cup

 QR = Qualifying Round
 QR1 = First Qualifying Round
 QR2 = Second Qualifying Round
 QR3 = Third Qualifying Round
 QR4 = Fourth Qualifying Round
 PO = Play-off Round
 GR = Group Stage
 FGR = Final Group Stage

 R1 = Round 1
 R2 = Round 2
 R3 = Round 3
 R4 = Round 4
 R5 = Round 5
 R6 = Round 6
 QF = Quarter-finals
 SF = Semi-finals

Seasons

See also
 The Invincibles (football)

Footnotes

References
 Levski Sofia - seasons
 

Seasons

Levski Sofia